The  Sri Lanka Police 125th Anniversary Medal was awarded to police officers in Sri Lanka who were in service on 3 September 1991, when the Sri Lanka Police celebrated its 125th anniversary.

See also
 Awards and decorations of the Sri Lanka Police
 Sri Lanka Army Volunteer Force Centenary Medal

References

External links
Sri Lanka Police

Civil awards and decorations of Sri Lanka
Law enforcement awards and honors
Awards established in 1991
1991 establishments in Sri Lanka